Robert or Bob Humphreys may refer to:

 Robert Humphreys (politician) (1893–1977), U.S. senator from Kentucky
 Robert Humphreys (priest),19th-century Anglican priest in Ireland
 Robert Cunningham Humphreys (1905–1965), American Republican party operative
 Robert J. Humphreys (born 1950), judge of the Virginia Court of Appeals
 Robin Humphreys (Robert Arthur Humphreys, 1907–1999), British historian
 Laud Humphreys (Robert Allan Humphreys, 1930–1988), American sociologist and author
 Bob Humphreys (baseball) (born 1935), American baseball player
 Bob Humphreys (athlete) (born 1936), American track and field athlete
 Bob Humphreys (American football) (born 1940), American football placekicker

See also
 Bob Humphries (1933–1988), English footballer
 Bob Humphrys (1952–2008), Welsh sports presenter
 Humphreys (surname)